The 9th South Indian International Movie Awards is an awards event held at Hyderabad International Convention Centre, Hyderabad on 18–19 September 2021.  The ceremony (9th SIIMA) recognized and honored the best films and performances from the Telugu, Tamil, Malayalam and Kannada films and music released in 2019 and 2020, along with special honors for lifetime contributions and a few special awards.

In 2020, the awards ceremony could not take place due to COVID-19 pandemic in India. So, it was scheduled for 11–12 September 2021. Later, it was rescheduled to 18–19 September 2021. The nomination list for the main awards was announced in August 2021. Sreemukhi, Sundeep Kishan and Dhanya Balakrishna have hosted the 2019 section (first day) of the awards ceremony. A total of 112 recipients won the awards in 21 categories across the four languages on the first day (2019 section). The winners for the year 2020 were announced on the second day of the event.

2019 winners and nominees

Honorary awards 
 Lifetime Achievement Award — Sheela

Main awards

Film

Acting

Debut awards

Music

Critics' choice awards 
Telugu cinema

 Best Actor – Nani – Jersey
 Best Actress – Rashmika Mandanna – Dear Comrade
Tamil cinema

 Best Actor – Karthi – Kaithi
 Best Actress – Manju Warrier – Asuran

Kannada cinema

 Best Actor – Rakshit Shetty – Avane Srimannarayana
 Best Actress – Rashmika Mandanna – Yajamana

Malayalam cinema

 Best Actor – Nivin Pauly – Moothon
Best Actress – Nimisha Sajayan – Chola

Technical awards 
 Best Dance Choreographer (Kannada) – Imran Sardhariya – Avane Srimannarayana

Generation Next awards 
Entertaining film of the Year : F2: Fun and Frustration (received by Anil Ravipudi, Dil Raju and Devi Sri Prasad)
Entertainer of the Year : Nani – Jersey and Nani's Gang Leader

2020 winners and nominees

Honorary awards 
 Lifetime Achievement Award — K. Viswanath
Special Appreciation Award — S. P. Balasubrahmanyam

Main awards 
Nominations for the main awards were announced in August 2021, while the awards were presented on 19 September 2021.

Film

Acting

Debut awards

Music

Critics' choice awards 
Telugu cinema
Best Actor – Sudheer Babu – V
Best Actress – Aishwarya Rajesh – World Famous Lover

Kannada cinema

 Best Actor – Prajwal Devaraj – Gentleman
 Best Actress – Kushee Ravi – Dia

Tamil cinema

 Best Actor – Ashok Selvan – Oh My Kadavule
 Best Actress – Aparna Balamurali – Soorarai Pottru

Malayalam cinema

 Best Actor – Kunchako Boban – Anjaam Pathiraa
 Best Actress – Anna Ben – Kappela

Special awards 
 Special Appreciation Award – Jayaram – Namo

Superlatives

2020

Presenters

2020

Notes

References

External links 
 2019 winners: 
 2020 winners: 

South Indian International Movie Awards
2021 Indian film awards